"Ode to Joy" (German:  , literally "To [the] Joy") is an ode written in the summer of 1785 by German poet, playwright, and historian Friedrich Schiller and published the following year in Thalia. A slightly revised version appeared in 1808, changing two lines of the first and omitting the last stanza.

"Ode to Joy" is best known for its use by Ludwig van Beethoven in the final (fourth) movement of his Ninth Symphony, completed in 1824. Beethoven's text is not based entirely on Schiller's poem, and it introduces a few new sections. His tune (but not Schiller's words) was adopted as the "Anthem of Europe" by the Council of Europe in 1972 and subsequently by the European Union. Rhodesia's national anthem from 1974 until 1979, "Rise, O Voices of Rhodesia", used the tune of "Ode to Joy".

The poem 

Schiller wrote the first version of the poem in German when he was staying in Gohlis, Leipzig. In the year 1785, from the beginning of May till mid-September, he stayed with his publisher, Georg Joachim Göschen, in Leipzig and wrote "An die Freude" along with his play Don Carlos.

Schiller later made some revisions to the poem, which was then republished posthumously in 1808, and it was this latter version that forms the basis for Beethoven's setting. Despite the lasting popularity of the ode, Schiller himself regarded it as a failure later in his life, going so far as to call it "detached from reality" and "of value maybe for us two, but not for the world, nor for the art of poetry" in an 1800 letter to his longtime friend and patron Christian Gottfried Körner (whose friendship had originally inspired him to write the ode).

Lyrics

Revisions 
The lines marked with * were revised in the posthumous 1808 edition as follows:

The original, later eliminated last stanza reads

Ode: To freedom 
Academic speculation remains as to whether Schiller originally wrote an ode "To Freedom" (An die Freiheit) and changed it to "To Joy". Thayer wrote in his biography of Beethoven, "the thought lies near that it was the early form of the poem, when it was still an 'Ode to Freedom' (not 'to Joy'), which first aroused enthusiastic admiration for it in Beethoven's mind". The musicologist Alexander Rehding points out that even Bernstein, who used "Freiheit" in two performances in 1989, called it conjecture whether Schiller used "joy" as code for "freedom" and that scholarly consensus holds that there is no factual basis for this myth.

Use of Beethoven's setting 

Over the years, Beethoven's "Ode to Joy" has remained a protest anthem and a celebration of music. 

 Demonstrators in Chile sang the piece during demonstrations against the Pinochet regime's dictatorship.

 Chinese students broadcast it at Tiananmen Square. It has recently inspired impromptu performances at public spaces by musicians in many countries worldwide, including Choir Without Borders's 2009 performance at a railway station in Leipzig, to mark the 20th and 25th anniversary of the Fall of the Berlin Wall, Hong Kong Festival Orchestra's 2013 performance at a Hong Kong mall, and performance in Sabadell, Spain. 

 A 2013 documentary, Following the Ninth, directed by Kerry Candaele, follows its continuing popularity. It was played after Emmanuel Macron's victory in the 2017 French Presidential elections, when Macron gave his victory speech at the Louvre. Pianist Igor Levit played the piece at the Royal Albert Hall during the 2017 Proms. 

 The BBC Proms Youth Choir performed the piece alongside Georg Solti's UNESCO World Orchestra for Peace at the Royal Albert Hall during the 2018 Proms at Prom 9, titled "War & Peace" as a commemoration to the centenary of the end of World War One.

 The alleged Christian context of the song was one of the main reasons given by Nichiren Shoshu priests for excommunicating the Soka Gakkai International (SGI) on 28 November 1991 due to the song being performed at SGI meetings, which was deemed by some priests as both syncretism and heresy.

Other musical settings 

Other musical settings of the poem include:
 Christian Gottfried Körner (1786)
 Carl Friedrich Zelter (1792), for choir and accompaniment, later rewritten for different instrumentations.
 Johann Friedrich Reichardt (1796)
 Ludwig-Wilhelm Tepper de Ferguson (1796)
 Johann Friedrich Hugo von Dalberg (1799)
 Johann Rudolf Zumsteeg (1803)

 Franz Schubert's song "An die Freude",  189, for voice, unison choir and piano. Composed in May 1815, Schubert's setting was first published in 1829 as Op. post. 111 No. 1. The 19th century Gesamt-Ausgabe included it as a lied in Series XX, Volume 2 (No. 66). The New Schubert Edition groups it with the part songs in Series III (Volume 3).
 Pyotr Ilyich Tchaikovsky (1865), for solo singers, choir and orchestra in a Russian translation
 Pietro Mascagni cantata "Alla gioia" (1882), Italian text by Andrea Maffei
 "Seid umschlungen, Millionen!" (1892), waltz by Johann Strauss II
 Z. Randall Stroope (2002), for choir and four-hand piano
 Victoria Poleva (2009), for soprano, mixed choir and symphony orchestra

References

External links

  (1786)
 
 An die Freude text and translations at The LiederNet Archive
 German and English text, Schiller Institute

1785 poems
1824 compositions
Compositions by Ludwig van Beethoven
Peace songs
Poetry by Friedrich Schiller